Sir Charles Kao Kuen  (November 4, 1933 – September 23, 2018) was an electrical engineer and  physicist who pioneered the development and use of fiber optics in telecommunications. In the 1960s, Kao created various methods to combine glass fibers with lasers in order to transmit digital data, which laid the groundwork for the evolution of the Internet.

Kao was born in Shanghai. His family settled in British Hong Kong in 1949. He graduated from a Hong Kong high school in 1953 and went to London to study electrical engineering. In the 1960s, Kao worked at Standard Telecommunication Laboratories, the research center of Standard Telephones and Cables (STC) in Harlow, and it was here in 1966 that he laid the groundwork for fiber optics in communication. Known as the "godfather of broadband", the "father of fiber optics", and the "father of fiber optic communications", he continued his work in Hong Kong at the Chinese University of Hong Kong, and in the United States at ITT (the parent corporation for STC) and Yale University.  Kao was awarded the 2009 Nobel Prize in Physics for "groundbreaking achievements concerning the transmission of light in fibers for optical communication". In 2010, he was knighted by Queen Elizabeth II for “services to fiber optic communications”.

A permanent resident of Hong Kong, Kao was a citizen of the United Kingdom and the United States.

Early life and education
Charles Kao was born in Shanghai in 1933 and lived with his parents in the Shanghai French Concession. He studied Chinese classics at home with his brother, under a tutor. He also studied English and French at the Shanghai World School that was founded by a number of progressive Chinese educators, including Cai Yuanpei.

During the Chinese Civil War, Kao's family settled in British Hong Kong in 1949. Much of his mother's siblings moved to Hong Kong in the late 1930s, among them, his mother's youngest brother took good care of him. Kao's family lived in Lau Sin Street, at the edge of the North Point, a neighbourhood of Shanghai immigrants. In Hong Kong, he spent four years at St. Joseph's College. At the time there were no electrical engineering major at the University of Hong Kong, hence, in 1953, he went to London to retake high school and went to Woolwich Polytechnic (now the University of Greenwich). He then pursued research and received his PhD in electrical engineering in 1965 from University of London, under Professor Harold Barlow of University College London as an external student while working at Standard Telecommunication Laboratories (STL) in Harlow, England, the research center of Standard Telephones and Cables.

Ancestry and family 
Kao's father , originated from Jinshan County, Jiangsu, obtained his Juris Doctor from the University of Michigan Law School in 1925. He was a judge at the Shanghai Concession and later a professor at Soochow University (then in Shanghai) Comparative Law School of China. Kao's mother originated from Baoshan County, Jiangsu.

His grandfather Kao Hsieh was a scholar, poet, artist, and a leading figure of the South Society during the late Qing Dynasty.

His father's cousin was astronomer Kao Ping-tse (Kao crater is named after him). Kao's younger brother Timothy Wu Kao is a civil engineer and Professor Emeritus at the Catholic University of America. His research is in hydrodynamics.

Kao met his future wife Gwen May-Wan Kao (née Wong) in London after graduation, when they worked together as engineers at Standard Telephones and Cables. She is British Chinese. They were married in 1959 in London, and had a son and a daughter, both of whom reside and work in Silicon Valley, California. According to Kao's autobiography, Kao was a Catholic who attended Catholic Church while his wife attended the Anglican Communion.

Academic career

Fiber optics and communications

In the 1960s at Standard Telecommunication Laboratories (STL) based in Harlow, Essex, England, Kao and his coworkers did their pioneering work in creating fiber optics as a telecommunications medium, by demonstrating that the high-loss of existing fiber optics arose from impurities in the glass, rather than from an underlying problem with the technology itself.

In 1963, when Kao first joined the optical communications research team he made notes summarising the background situation and available technology at the time, and identifying the key individuals involved. Initially Kao worked in the team of Antoni E. Karbowiak (Toni Karbowiak), who was working under Alec Reeves to study optical waveguides for communications. Kao's task was to investigate fiber attenuation, for which he collected samples from different fiber manufacturers and also investigated the properties of bulk glasses carefully. Kao's study primarily convinced him that the impurities in material caused the high light losses of those fibers. Later that year, Kao was appointed head of the electro-optics research group at STL. He took over the optical communication program of STL in December 1964, because his supervisor, Karbowiak, left to take the Chair in Communications in the School of Electrical Engineering at the University of New South Wales (UNSW), Sydney, Australia.

Although Kao succeeded Karbowiak as manager of optical communications research, he immediately decided to abandon Karbowiak's plan (thin-film waveguide) and overall change research direction with his colleague George Hockham. They not only considered optical physics but also the material properties. The results were first presented by Kao to the IEE in January 1966 in London, and further published in July with George Hockham (1964–1965 worked with Kao). This study first theorized and proposed to use glass fibers to implement optical communication, the ideas (especially structural features and materials) described are largely the basis of today's optical fiber communications.

In 1965, Kao with Hockham concluded that the fundamental limitation for glass light attenuation is below 20 dB/km (decibels per kilometer, is a measure of the attenuation of a signal over a distance), which is a key threshold value for optical communications. However, at the time of this determination, optical fibers commonly exhibited light loss as high as 1,000 dB/km and even more. This conclusion opened the intense race to find low-loss materials and suitable fibres for reaching such criteria. 

Kao, together with his new team (members including T. W. Davies, M. W. Jones and C. R. Wright), pursued this goal by testing various materials. They precisely measured the attenuation of light with different wavelengths in glasses and other materials. During this period, Kao pointed out that the high purity of fused silica (SiO2) made it an ideal candidate for optical communication. Kao also stated that the impurity of glass material is the main cause for the dramatic decay of light transmission inside glass fiber, rather than fundamental physical effects such as scattering as many physicists thought at that time, and such impurity could be removed. This led to a worldwide study and production of high-purity glass fibers. When Kao first proposed that such glass fiber could be used for long-distance information transfer and could replace copper wires which were used for telecommunication during that era, his ideas were widely disbelieved; later people realized that Kao's ideas revolutionized the whole communication technology and industry.

He also played a leading role in the early stage of engineering and commercial realization of optical communication. In spring 1966, Kao traveled to the U.S. but failed to interest Bell Labs, which was a competitor of STL in communication technology at that time. He subsequently traveled to Japan and gained support. Kao visited many glass and polymer factories, discussed with various people including engineers, scientists, businessmen about the techniques and improvement of glass fiber manufacture. In 1969, Kao with M. W. Jones measured the intrinsic loss of bulk-fused silica at 4 dB/km, which is the first evidence of ultra-transparent glass. Bell Labs started considering fiber optics seriously. As of 2017, fiber optic losses (from both bulk and intrinsic sources) are as low as 0.1419 dB/km at the 1.56 µm wavelength.

Kao developed important techniques and configurations for glass fiber waveguides, and contributed to the development of different fiber types and system devices which met both civil and military application requirements, and peripheral supporting systems for optical fiber communication. In mid-1970s, he did seminal work on glass fiber fatigue strength. When named the first ITT Executive Scientist, Kao launched the "Terabit Technology" program in addressing the high frequency limits of signal processing, so Kao is also known as the "father of the terabit technology concept". Kao has published more than 100 papers and was granted over 30 patents, including the water-resistant high-strength fibers (with M. S. Maklad).

At an early stage of developing optic fibers, Kao already strongly preferred single-mode for long-distance optical communication, instead of using multi-mode systems. His vision later was followed and now is applied almost exclusively. Kao was also a visionary of modern submarine communications cables and largely promoted this idea. He predicted in 1983 that world's seas would be littered with fiber optics, five years ahead of the time that such a trans-oceanic fiber-optic cable first became serviceable.

Ali Javan's introduction of a steady helium–neon laser and Kao's discovery of fiber light-loss properties now are recognized as the two essential milestones for the development of fiber-optic communications.

Later work
Kao joined the Chinese University of Hong Kong (CUHK) in 1970 to found the Department of Electronics, which later became the Department of Electronic Engineering. During this period, Kao was the reader and then the chair Professor of Electronics at CUHK; he built up both undergraduate and graduate study programs of electronics and oversaw the graduation of his first students. Under his leadership, the School of Education and other new research institutes were established. He returned to ITT Corporation in 1974 (the parent corporation of STC at that time) in the United States and worked in Roanoke, Virginia, first as Chief Scientist and later as Director of Engineering. In 1982, he became the first ITT Executive Scientist and was stationed mainly at the Advanced Technology Center in Connecticut. While there, he served as an adjunct professor and Fellow of Trumbull College at Yale University. In 1985, Kao spent one year in West Germany, at the SEL Research Center. In 1986, Kao was the Corporate Director of Research at ITT.

He was one of the earliest to study the environmental effects of land reclamation in Hong Kong, and presented one of his first related studies at the conference of the Association of Commonwealth Universities (ACU) in Edinburgh in 1972.

Kao was the vice-chancellor of the Chinese University of Hong Kong from 1987 to 1996. From 1991, Kao was an Independent Non-Executive Director and a member of the Audit Committee of the Varitronix International Limited in Hong Kong. From 1993 to 1994, he was the President of the Association of Southeast Asian Institutions of Higher Learning (ASAIHL). In 1996, Kao donated to Yale University, and the Charles Kao Fund Research Grants was established to support Yale's studies, research and creative projects in Asia. The fund currently is managed by Yale University Councils on East Asian and Southeast Asian Studies. After his retirement from CUHK in 1996, Kao spent his six-month sabbatical leave at the Imperial College London Department of Electrical and Electronic Engineering; from 1997 to 2002, he also served as visiting professor in the same department.

Kao was chairman and member of the Energy Advisory Committee (EAC) of Hong Kong for two years, and retired from the position on July 15, 2000. Kao was a Member of the Council of Advisors on Innovation and Technology of Hong Kong, appointed on April 20, 2000. In 2000, Kao co-founded the Independent Schools Foundation Academy, which is located in Cyberport, Hong Kong. He was its founding chairman in 2000, and stepped down from the board of the ISF in December 2008. Kao was the keynote speaker at IEEE GLOBECOM 2002 in Taipei, Taiwan. In 2003, Kao was named a Chair Professor by special appointment at the Electronics Institute of the College of Electrical Engineering and Computer Science, National Taiwan University. Kao then worked as the chairman and CEO of Transtech Services Ltd., a telecommunication consultancy in Hong Kong. He was the founder, chairman and CEO of ITX Services Limited. From 2003 to January 30, 2009, Kao was an independent non-executive director and member of the audit committee of Next Media.

Awards 
Kao received numerous awards such as the Nobel Prize in Physics., Grand Bauhinia Medal, Marconi Prize, Prince Philip Medal, Charles Stark Draper Award, Bell Award, SPIE Gold Medal, Japan International Award, Faraday Medal, James C. McGroddy Prize for New Materials......

Honors 
 1993: A Commander of the Most Excellent Order of the British Empire (CBE)
 2010: A Knight Commander of the Most Excellent Order of the British Empire (KBE)
 2010: The Grand Bauhinia Medal (GBM), Hong Kong SAR

Society and academy recognition 
 Life Fellow, Institute of Electrical and Electronics Engineers, USA (1979 election)
 Fellow, The Institution of Engineering and Technology, UK
 Elected a Fellow of the Royal Society (FRS) in 1997
 Fellow, The Royal Academy of Engineering, UK (1989 election)
 Fellow, The Marconi Society, USA (1985 election)
 Honorary Fellow (1994 election) and former President, The Hong Kong Academy of Engineering Sciences (HKAES), Hong Kong
 Distinguished Fellow, The Hong Kong Computer Society, Hong Kong (1989 election)
 Honorary Fellow, The Hong Kong Institute of Engineers (1994 election)
 Academician, Academia Sinica, Taipei (1992 election)
 Member, Optical Society of America, USA
 Member, European Academy of Sciences and Arts, Austria
 Member, United States National Academy of Engineering (1990 election)
 Foreign Member, Royal Swedish Academy of Engineering Sciences, Sweden (1988 election)
 Foreign Member, Chinese Academy of Sciences, Beijing (1996 election)
 Fellow, Trumbull College of Yale University
 Honorary Fellow, The Queen Mary, University of London
 Honorary Professor, Chinese University of Hong Kong (appointed in 1996)
 Honorary Professor, Peking University, Beijing (appointed in 1995)
 Honorary Professor, Tsinghua University, Beijing (appointed in 1995)
 Honorary Professor, Beijing University of International Business and Economics, Beijing (appointed in 1995)
 Honorary Professor, Beijing University of Posts and Telecommunications (appointed in 1995)
 Chair Professor by special appointment, National Taiwan University, Taipei (appointed in 2003)
 Honorary Professor (1997–2002), Department of Electronic Engineering, City University of Hong Kong
 Lifetime Honorary Professorship, City University of Hong Kong (appointed on January 1, 2002)
 Advisor of Macao Science and Technology Council

Honorary degrees 

 Honorary Doctor of Science, Chinese University of Hong Kong, British Hong Kong (1985)
 Doctor of Science, The University of Sussex, U.K. (1990)
 Doctor of Engineering, National Chiao Tung University, Taiwan (1990)
 Degree of Honorary Doctor, Soka University, Japan (1991)
 Doctor of Engineering, The University of Glasgow, U.K. (1992)
 Honorary DCL, Durham University, U.K. (1994)
 Doctor of the University, Griffith University, Australia (1995)
 Honorary degree in "Telecommunications engineering", University of Padua, Italy (Oct 18, 1996)
 Doctor of Science, University of Hull, U.K. (1998)
 Doctor of Science, Yale University, USA (1999)
 Doctor of Science Honoris Causa, University of Greenwich, U.K. (2002)
 Doctor of Science, Princeton University, USA (2004)
 Honorary doctor of laws degree, University of Toronto, Canada (June 16, 2005)
 Honorary Doctor, Beijing University of Posts and Telecommunications, China (2007)
 Honorary Doctorate of Science, University College London, U.K. (2010)
 Honorary Degree, University of Strathclyde, U.K. (Sep 24, 2010)
 Doctor of Science honoris causa, University of Hong Kong, Hong Kong S.A.R., China (2011)

Awards 

Kao donated most of his prize medals to the Chinese University of Hong Kong.
 1976: The Morey Award, American Ceramic Society, USA
 1977: The Stuart Ballantine Medal, Franklin Institute, USA
 1978: The Rank Prize in Optoelectronics, Rank Trust Fund, UK
 1978: The IEEE Morris N. Liebmann Memorial Award. Citation: "for making communication at optical frequencies practical by discovering, inventing, and developing the material, techniques and configurations for glass fiber waveguides and, in particular, for recognizing and proving by careful measurements in bulk glasses that silicon glass could provide the requisite low optical loss needed for a practical communication system".
 1979: The L. M. Ericsson International Prize, Sweden
 1980: The Gold Medal, AFCEA, USA
 1981: The CESASC Achievement Award, Southern California, USA
 1983: USAI Achievement Award, U.S.-Asia Institute, USA
 1985: The IEEE Alexander Graham Bell Medal
 1985: The Marconi International Scientist Award, Marconi Foundation, USA
 1985: The Columbus Medal of the City of Genoa, Italy
 1986: The CIE Achievement Award of the CIE-USA Annual Awards, USA
 1987: The C & C Prize, Foundation for Communication and Computer Promotion, Japan
 1989: The Faraday Medal, Institution of Electrical Engineers, UK
 1989: The James C. McGroddy Prize for New Materials, American Physical Society (APS). Citation: "for contribution to the materials research and development that resulted in practical low loss optical fibers, one of the cornerstones of optical communications technology".
 1992: The Gold Medal of the Society, SPIE
 1995: The Gold Medal for Engineering Excellence, The World Federation of Engineering Organizations (WFEO), UK
 1996: The Prince Philip Medal of the Royal Academy of Engineering, UK, in recognition of "his pioneering work which led to the invention of optical fiber and for his leadership in its engineering and commercial realization; and for his distinguished contribution to higher education in Hong Kong"
 1996: la Citta' di Padova, Italy
 1996: The 12th Japan Prize. Citation: "for pioneering research on wide-band, low-loss optical fiber communications".
 1998: The International Lecture Medal, IEE, UK.
 1999: The Charles Stark Draper Prize (co-recipient with Robert D. Maurer and John B. MacChesney), USA
 2001: Millennium Outstanding Engineer Award, Hong Kong
 2006: The HKIE Gold Medal Award, HKIE (The Hong Kong Institute of Engineers), Hong Kong
 2009: The Nobel Prize in Physics (1/2 of the prize), Sweden. Citation: "for groundbreaking achievements concerning the transmission of light in fibers for optical communication".
 2009: The IEEE Photonics Society Plaque
 2010 (Feb 27): Distinguished Science & Technology Award, 2010 Asian American Engineer of the Year Award, AAEOY 2010, USA
 2010 (Mar 27): 2009/2010 World Chinese Grand Prize, Phoenix Television, Hong Kong
 2010 (April 8/9): Chinese American Distinction Award, San Francisco, USA
 20 Feb 2014: FTTH Operators Award and Individual Award

Namesakes 

 The minor planet 3463 Kaokuen, discovered in 1981, was named after Kao in 1996.
 1996 (November 7): The north wing of the Chinese University of Hong Kong Science Center was named the Charles Kuen Kao Building.
 2009 (December 30): The landmark auditorium in the Hong Kong Science Park was named after Kao  – the Charles K. Kao Auditorium.
 2010 (March 18): Professor Charles Kao Square, a square of the Independent Schools Foundation Academy
 2014 (September): Sir Charles Kao UTC (now known as BMAT STEM Academy) was opened.
 2014: Kao Data, a data center operator based on the former site of Sir Charles Kao's work on fiber optics cables, was founded.

Others 
 Featured in Science Museum London
 Hong Kong Affairs Adviser (May 1994 – June 30, 1997)
 1999: Asian of the Century, Science and Technology
 2002: Leader of the Year – Innovation Technology Category, Sing Tao, Hong Kong
 October 21, 2002: Inducted into the Engineering Hall of Fame, the 50th Anniversary Issue, Electronic Design
 January 3, 2008: Inducted into the Celebration 60, British Council's 60th anniversary in Hong Kong
 November 4, 2009: Honorary citizenship, and the "Dr. Charles Kao Day" in Mountain View, California, USA
 2009: Hong Kong's Person of the Year
 The Top 10 Asian Achievements of 2009 – No.7
 2010 (February): Honoree, Committee of 100, USA
 The 2010 OFC/NFOEC Conferences were dedicated to Kao, March 23–25, San Diego, California, USA.
 May 14–15, 2010: Two sessions were dedicated to Kao at the 19th Annual Wireless and Optical Communications Conference (WOCC 2010), Shanghai, P.R. China.
 May 22, 2010: Inducted into the memento archive of the 2010 Shanghai World Expo
 Mid-2010: Hong Kong Definitive Stamp Sheetlet (No. 1), Hong Kong SAR
 March 25, 2011: Blue plaque unveiled in Harlow, Essex, UK
 November 4, 2014: Gimme Fiber Day on Kao's birthday, FTTH Councils Global Alliance
 On November 4, 2021, Google celebrated Kao's birthday with a Google Doodle. The binary output in the graphic spells out 'KAO' when converted to ASCII.

Later life and death 
Kao's international travels led him to opine that he belonged to the world instead of any country. An open letter published by Kao and his wife in 2010 later clarified that "Charles studied in Hong Kong for his high schooling, he has taught here, he was the Vice-Chancellor of CUHK and retired here too. So he is a Hong Kong belonger."

Pottery making was a hobby of Kao's. Kao also enjoyed reading wuxia (Chinese martial fantasy) novels.

Kao suffered from Alzheimer's disease from early 2004 and had speech difficulty, but had no problem recognising people or addresses. His father suffered from the same disease. Beginning in 2008, he resided in Mountain View, California, United States, where he moved from Hong Kong in order to live near his children and grandchild.

On October 6, 2009, when Kao was awarded the Nobel Prize in Physics for his contributions to the study of the transmission of light in optical fibers and for fiber communication, he said, "I am absolutely speechless and never expected such an honor." Kao's wife Gwen told the press that the prize will primarily be used for Charles's medical expenses. In 2010 Charles and Gwen Kao founded the Charles K. Kao Foundation for Alzheimer's Disease to raise public awareness about the disease and provide support for the patients.

In 2016, Kao lost the ability to maintain his balance. At the end-stage of his dementia he was cared for by his wife and intended not to be kept alive with life support or have CPR performed on him. Kao died at Bradbury Hospice in Hong Kong on 23 September 2018 at the age of 84.

Works 
 Optical fiber technology; by Charles K. Kao. IEEE Press, New York, USA; 1981.
 Optical Fiber Technology, II; by Charles K. Kao. IEEE Press, New York, USA; 1981, 343 pages.  .
 Optical Fiber Systems: Technology, Design, and Applications; by Charles K. Kao. McGraw-Hill, USA; 1982; 204 pages.  .
 Optical fiber (IEE materials & devices series, Volume 6); by Charles K. Kao. Palgrave Macmillan on behalf of IEEE; 1988; University of Michigan; 158 pages.  
 A Choice Fulfilled: the Business of High Technology; by Charles K. Kao. The Chinese University Press/ Palgrave Macmillan; 1991, 203 pages.  
 Tackling the Millennium Bug Together: Public Conferences; by Charles K. Kao. Central Policy Unit, Hong Kong; 48 pages, 1998.
 Technology Road Maps for Hong Kong: a Preliminary Study; by Charles K. Kao. Office of Industrial and Business Development, The Chinese University of Hong Kong; 126 pages, 1990.
 Nonlinear Photonics: Nonlinearities in Optics, Optoelectronics and Fiber Communications; by Yili Guo, Kin S. Chiang, E. Herbert Li, and Charles K. Kao. The Chinese University Press, Hong Kong; 2002, 600 pages.

Notes

References

Further reading 
 
 
 
 
 K. C. Kao (June 1986), "1012 bit/s Optoelectronics Technology", IEE Proceedings 133, Pt.J, No 3, 230–236.

External links 

 Optical Fibre History at STL
  including the Nobel Lecture 8 December 2009 Sand from centuries past; Send future voices fast
 BBC: Lighting the way to a revolution
 Mountain View Voice: The legacy of Charles Kao
 Man who lit up the world – Professor Charles Kao CBE FREng Ingenia, Issue 43, June 2010

1933 births
2018 deaths
Academics of Imperial College London
Academics of Queen Mary University of London
Alumni of University of London Worldwide
Alumni of the University of London
Alumni of the University of Greenwich
Alumni of University College London
American electrical engineers
American Nobel laureates
American people of Hong Kong descent
American physicists
American people of Chinese descent
British electrical engineers
British emigrants to the United States
British Nobel laureates
British physicists
Chinese University of Hong Kong people
Draper Prize winners
Fellows of the Royal Society
Fellows of the Royal Academy of Engineering
Fellow Members of the IEEE
Fellows of the Institution of Engineering and Technology
Fiber-optic communications
Hong Kong Affairs Advisors
Hong Kong electrical engineers
Hong Kong emigrants to England
Hong Kong Nobel laureates
Hong Kong physicists
Knights Commander of the Order of the British Empire
Members of Academia Sinica
Members of the European Academy of Sciences and Arts
Members of the Royal Swedish Academy of Engineering Sciences
Members of the United States National Academy of Engineering
Foreign members of the Chinese Academy of Sciences
Naturalised citizens of the United Kingdom
Nobel laureates in Physics
People with Alzheimer's disease
Recipients of the Grand Bauhinia Medal
Physicists from Shanghai
Shanghai Nobel laureates
Vice-Chancellors of the Chinese University of Hong Kong
Yale University faculty
Yale University fellows
Educators from Shanghai
SPIE
ITT Inc. people
Chinese emigrants to Hong Kong
Chinese Roman Catholics
British Roman Catholics
American Roman Catholics
Optical engineers
Optical physicists